Larisa Valeriïvna Griga ( Larysa Valeriivna Hryha; born 31 May 1984) is a badminton player from Ukraine. She was the gold medalist at the 2003 European Junior Championships in the girls' singles event. She competed at the 2008 and 2012 Olympic Games.

Career 
She played at the 2005 IBF World Championships in Anaheim and reached the second round (lost to 2nd seed Xie Xingfang of China).

As a part of the BC Amersfoort team, Griga reached the final of the European Cup 2007 held in Amersfoort. Together with Lotte Bruil-Jonathans, Yao Jie, Dicky Palyama and Eric Pang the final was lost against the team of NL Primorje. In the semi finals they were too strong for CB Rinconada. Since the autumn of 2008, Griga is playing for the club Fyrisfjädern in Uppsala, Sweden.

Achievements

European Junior Championships 
Girls' singles

BWF Grand Prix 
The BWF Grand Prix had two levels, the Grand Prix and Grand Prix Gold. It was a series of badminton tournaments sanctioned by the Badminton World Federation (BWF) and played between 2007 and 2017.

Women's singles

  BWF Grand Prix Gold tournament
  BWF Grand Prix tournament

BWF International Challenge/Series 
Women's singles

Women's doubles

  BWF International Challenge tournament
  BWF International Series tournament

References

External links 
 

1984 births
Living people
Sportspeople from Dnipro
Ukrainian female badminton players
Badminton players at the 2008 Summer Olympics
Badminton players at the 2012 Summer Olympics
Olympic badminton players of Ukraine
21st-century Ukrainian women